Cornuplura is a genus of cicadas in the family Cicadidae. There are at least three described species in Cornuplura.

Species
These three species belong to the genus Cornuplura:
 Cornuplura curvispinosa (Davis, 1936)
 Cornuplura nigroalbata (Davis, 1936)
 Cornuplura rudis (Walker, 1858)

References

Further reading

 
 
 
 
 
 
 
 
 

Articles created by Qbugbot
Cryptotympanini
Cicadidae genera